The Chamber of Deputies is the lower house of Haiti's bicameral legislature, the Haitian Parliament. The upper house of the Haitian Parliament is the Senate of Haiti. The Chamber has 119 members (previously 99) who are elected by popular vote to four-year terms. There are no term limits for Deputies; they may be re-elected indefinitely.

In March 2015 a new electoral decree stated that the new Chamber of Deputies have 118 members, and the Senate will retain the 30 members. On 13 March, President Michel Martelly issued a decree that split the Cerca La Source into two constituencies, and therefore increasing the number of deputies up to 119.

Elections history 
The first bicameral legislature, created under Alexandre Pétion's 1816 revision to the 1806 constitution, formed the Senate as the upper house and the Chamber of Representatives of the Communes as the lower house. The Chamber, which was first elected on 10 February 1817 and held its first session on 22 April 1817, elected Pierre André as its first president of the chamber. Pétion gave his final public speech in front of the newly-seated chamber, but then suspended the legislature the following year.

Candidates from Jean-Bertrand Aristide's Fanmi Lavalas party took 73 of the then 83 seats in the 2000 elections. Following the overthrow of the government in February 2004, an interim government was established. The terms of the Deputies expired during the rule of the interim government and the Chamber remained empty. It was re-established along with the Senate, and elections were scheduled for November 2005. After many delays and missed deadlines, elections were finally held on 21 April 2006. The Deputies commenced meeting in June 2006. The exact makeup of the Chamber remains unknown as the Provisional Electoral Committee (CEP) has not posted the results. The next Chamber elections were scheduled for 2010. There were new parliamentary elections in 2015–16.

Previous composition

Presidents of the Chamber of Deputies 
Le Président de la Chambre / Prezidan Chanm Depite

See also 
 List of current members of the National Assembly of Haiti

References 

 
 

Haiti
Government of Haiti